Komarapalayam is a textile town situated on the bank of the Cauvery river, Bhavani River of South India, and is a taluk of Namakkal District, Tamil Nadu, India. Komarapalayam is also called as Kumarapalayam. Komarapalayam and Bhavani are twin cities separated by the Cauvery river. However, Bhavani belongs to Erode district. Komarapalayam is famous for its textile industries; also Kumarapalayam is famous for traditional leather chappals. As of 2011, the town had a population of 71,594. Some of the native people call it as Guberapuri due to high industrial production.

Municipal administration
In 1978, Kumarapalayam town was upgraded from the status of town Panchayat to Municipality and is now a taluk. It has a population of 71,594 and an extent of 7.10 km2., as per Survey and Land records. The town is divided into 33 wards.

The Municipal Council, composed of 33 ward councillors, is headed by a chairperson who is elected by voters of the town. The councillors elect a Vice-Chairperson from among themselves. The executive wing is headed by a commissioner, and he is assisted by a team of officials including a revenue inspector, sanitary officer, manager, municipal engineer, town planning inspector and other officers.

The annual anticipated income of the town is ₹24 million, and the expenditure is ₹34 million annually.

Overview
Kumarapalayam is famous for its textile industries and its related activities. There are many spinning mills, yarn dyeing processing units, manual dyeing units, weaving units, calendering mills, export-oriented units, and related ancillary units in and around Kumarapalayam.The major political party in Kumarapalayam is AIADMK and it is also called as the fort of AIADMK.

The state government, in assistance with the central government, is setting up a high-tech park for shuttle-less looms in Kumarapalayam called Cauvery Hi-Tech Weaving Park.

Kumarapalayam lies between 11° 20" and 11° 30" northern latitude and between 77° 40" and 77° 50" eastern longitude.

Kumarapalayam town was upgraded as third grade municipality from the status of town Panchayat on 30 March 1978 and subsequently upgraded as Second grade Municipality from 17 April 1984. Now, it is functioning as First grade Municipality as per G.O.M.S.No.634, Municipal Administration and Water Supply Department dated 5 July 1990. The town is divided into 33 wards.

The Municipal Council, which is composed of 33 ward councillors, is headed by Chairperson, who is elected directly by voters of the town.  The councillors elect a Vice-Chairperson among them.

Kumarapalayam is noted by Kollywood as a "B Centre" city for Tamil films. There were 8 cinema theatres; at present, only 6 are in business: (1) RAS Theatre, (2) Laxmi Theatre, (3) Saraswathi Theatre, (4) Murugan Theatre (now closed), (5) Gowri Theatre, (6) KON Theatre (now called as CSM theatre), (7) Rajam Theatre, and (8) Saravana Theatre (now, a Super Market).

It is observed as one of the key centers due to its labour population.
 Pincode no: 638183
 STD Code: 04288

Demographics

According to 2011 census, Kumarapalayam had a population of 71,594 with a sex-ratio of 994 females for every 1,000 males, much above the national average of 929. A total of 6,095 were under the age of six, constituting 3,126 males and 2,969 females. Scheduled Castes and Scheduled Tribes accounted for 4.43% and 0.04% of the population respectively. The average literacy of the town was 72.14%, compared to the national average of 72.99%. The town had a total of 20,439 households. There were a total of 37,106 workers, comprising 212 cultivators, 257 main agricultural labourers, 1,767 in house hold industries, 33,774 other workers, 1,096 marginal workers, 19 marginal cultivators, 15 marginal agricultural labourers, 128 marginal workers in household industries and 934 other marginal workers. As per the religious census of 2011, Kumarapalayam had 97.12% Hindus, 1.58% Muslims, 1.22% Christians, 0.0% Sikhs, 0.0% Buddhists, 0.0% Jains, 0.07% following other religions and 0.0% following no religion or did not indicate any religious preference.

Constituency 

Traditionally, Kumarapalayam was part of the nearby Tiruchengode Legislative Assembly until 2011. In 2011, it was separated from Tiruchengode to form a new constituency along with Pallipalayam (a nearby town).

In Lok Sabha Constituency (Parliamentary), it was rallied between Tiruchengode and Erode Parliamentary constituencies while settling for the later in the Lok Sabha elections held in 2009.

Climate conditions

Kumarapalayam has a warm and sunny climate during summer (March - May), with the sun scorching around 35 °C to 40 °C during day time. In the months of September to December, the day time would be pleasant with temperature not more than 35 °C, while the early mornings are usually cold. Rainfall is not too extreme even during the monsoon season.

Connectivity

Roadways is the primary means of transport. National Highway 544, a dual-carriage highway with services roads, passes near the town. It gives access to Salem and Coimbatore which are 56 and 107 kilometres respectively. Government and privately owned buses are available to reach Erode, Pallipalayam, Bhavani, Perundurai, Tiruchengode, Namakkal, Rasipuram, Sankagiri, Salem, Edappadi, Mettur, Anthiyur, Tiruppur and Coimbatore with more frequencies. There are some long-distance buses available to Palani and Chennai  but with less frequency. 
Overall, the town has poor bus facility, people seek establish a new mofussil bus stand near bypass. Currently, town depends Bhavani Bus stand for connectivity, where the frequency of buses are more. But currently the Salem Airport does not operate long-distance flights. So people wanted to travel to Coimbatore Airport (98 km) where the frequency and connectivity of flights to other cities are more.

See also 
Veppadai
Bhavani

References

External links 

Cities and towns in Namakkal district